The Drisha Institute for Jewish Education is a center for advanced Jewish learning located on the Upper West Side of New York City. Though initially founded to promote advanced scholarship for women, it has since expanded to offer an array of text-based learning opportunities for men and women of all ages. Its stated mission is to provide students with the opportunity to encounter texts in an intellectually rigorous and inclusive manner.

Educational programs 

Drisha offers ongoing classes, community lectures (including Dirshu: Confronting Challenges with Heart and Mind), a Winter Week of Learning, the Drishat Shalom Fellowship for graduate students and young professionals, winter and summer programs for college students, a summer program for high school girls, High Holiday prayer services, an executive seminar, and various programs in Israel.

History 

Drisha was founded by Rabbi David Silber in 1979 as the world's first center dedicated specifically to women's studies of classical Jewish texts (e.g., the Hebrew Bible and Talmud). Rabbi Silber received ordination from Yeshiva University's Rabbi Isaac Elchanan Theological Seminary, and was the recipient of the Covenant Award in 2000. He is the author of A Passover Haggadah: Go Forth and Learn.

References

External links

See also
 Jewish feminism
 Midrasha - overview of higher Jewish learning institutions for women.
 Role of women in Judaism - discusses various views of woman's study, including Haredi objections to Talmud study by women.
 Torah study - discusses the mitzvah of learning.
similarly focused Midrashot:
Matan
Nishmat
Midreshet Lindenbaum
Midreshet Ein HaNetziv
Yeshivot ordaining women:
 Beit Midrash Har'el (Orthodox)
 Maharat (Open Orthodox)

Jewish organizations based in New York City
Jewish educational organizations
Jews and Judaism in Manhattan
Orthodox Jewish schools for women
Jewish seminaries
Jewish organizations established in 1979
1979 establishments in New York City